Amokrane Ould Aoudia (23 November 1924 – 23 May 1959) was a student close to the PCA in Algiers; in Paris, he was a member of the group of communist students of the Sorbonne and a member of the PCF; he was also the lawyer of the FLN collective.

Biography

Early life and studies 
Amokrane Ould Aoudia was born in Michelet, in a Christianised Kabyle family where there were many jurists and magistrates. His uncle, Boudjemâ Benjamin Ould Aoudia, also a native of Michelet in Kabylia, was a simple shepherd. Picked up by the White Fathers of Ouaghzen in October 1899 and converted to Catholicism. He became a lawyer at the Algiers bar and a member of the "group of 61", that is to say of the group of Muslims in the Algerian assembly demanding the right to self-determination. Amokrane's father was a public works contractor, his mother did not work.

Amokrane Ould Aoudia first attended the school in Ouagzen, before attending the modern college of Tizi-Ouzou. He was then admitted to the vocational school of Maison-Carrée reserved for the technical education of "natives". After World War II, Amokrane Ould Aoudia gave up becoming an army officer. Close to the Algerian Communist Party, he became a boarding school teacher in Algiers and gave private lessons, before enrolling at the faculty of Algiers to study law.

A young lawyer 
As a lawyer registered at the Paris Bar in 1954, his first client was his friend Jean Beckouche, federally responsible for the language groups of colony students, and who was appointed by the EOR for political reasoning. It was Amokrane Ould Aoudia who decided to take the case to the Paris Administrative Court and file an "abuse of power" complaint against the Secretary of State for War.

Algerian War 
The Algerian war was an interruption in his political engagement as it ended the PCF anti-colonial line. He then joined the FLN. Initially associated with the lawyer Mourad Oussedik, he decided in 1957 to work alone and open his own practice, No.1 Rue Anatole France. Then, in November 1958, at Rue Saint-Marc near the Stock Exchange. Known for his sympathies for the FLN and his commitment to the independence of Algeria, he rarely dealt with common law trials, mainly engaged in pleading political cases.

Likewise, he worked mainly in France, only going once to Algeria to plead alongside Ali Boumendjel. executed by paratroopers in March 1957. Like other lawyers responsible for the defence of activists in favour of Algerian independence, Ould Aoudia denounced the torture practised by the French army and police during the conflict. Thus, with Jacques Vergès, he sent on September 8, 1958, an open letter to the Minister of Culture, André Malraux, to denounce the torture suffered by two of his clients, Hocine Rezgui, a worker from the Potez factories, and Mohamed Krama, driver at the Teka factories in Courbevoie, in the Argenteuil police station, where police violence was frequent and daily.

Assassination
Amokrane Ould Aoudia was shot dead on 23 May 1959 in front of his office in the 2nd arrondissement of Paris. According to, in particular, the investigative journalist Vincent Nouzille, this assassination was carried out by order of the French authorities, by the SDECE as part of a homo operation.

See also

Jacques Vergès

References 

20th-century Algerian lawyers
1924 births
1959 deaths
Assassinated Algerian politicians
People murdered in France